James Addison Baker III (born April 28, 1930) is an American attorney, diplomat and statesman. A member of the Republican Party, he served as the 10th White House Chief of Staff and 67th United States Secretary of the Treasury under President Ronald Reagan and the 61st U.S. Secretary of State before returning as the 16th White House Chief of Staff under President George H. W. Bush.

Born in Houston, Baker attended The Hill School and Princeton University before serving in the United States Marine Corps. After graduating from the University of Texas School of Law, he pursued a legal career. He became a close friend of George H. W. Bush and worked for Bush's unsuccessful 1970 campaign for the United States Senate. After the campaign, he served in various positions for President Richard Nixon. In 1975, he was appointed Under Secretary of Commerce for Gerald Ford. He served until May 1976, ran Ford's 1976 presidential campaign, and unsuccessfully sought election as the Attorney General of Texas.

Baker ran Bush's unsuccessful campaign for the 1980 Republican presidential nomination, but made a favorable impression on the Republican nominee, Ronald Reagan. Reagan appointed Baker as his White House Chief of Staff, and Baker remained in that position until 1985, when he became the Secretary of the Treasury. As Treasury Secretary, he arranged the Plaza Accord and the Baker Plan. He resigned as Treasury Secretary to manage Bush's successful 1988 campaign for president. After the election, Bush appointed Baker to the position of Secretary of State. As Secretary of State, he helped oversee U.S. foreign policy during the end of the Cold War and dissolution of the Soviet Union, as well as during the Gulf War. After the Gulf War, Baker served another stint as White House Chief of Staff from 1992 to 1993.

Baker remained active in business and public affairs after Bush's defeat in the 1992 presidential election. He served as a United Nations envoy to Western Sahara and as a consultant to Enron. During the Florida recount following the 2000 presidential election, he managed George W. Bush's legal team in the state. He served as the co-chairman of the Iraq Study Group, which Congress formed in 2006 to study Iraq and the ongoing Iraq War. He serves on the World Justice Project and the Climate Leadership Council. Baker is the namesake of the James A. Baker III Institute for Public Policy at Rice University.

Early life, education, and pre-political career
James Addison Baker III was born in Houston at 1216 Bissonnet St., the son of James A. Baker Jr. (1892–1973) and Ethel Bonner (née Means) Baker (August 6, 1894 – April 26, 1991). His father was a partner of Houston law firm Baker Botts. Baker has a sister, Bonner Baker Moffitt. His grandfather was attorney and banker Captain James A. Baker, and his great-grandfather was jurist and politician Judge James A. Baker.

Baker attended The Kinkaid School in Houston, before graduating from The Hill School, a boarding school in Pottstown, Pennsylvania. He graduated cum laude with an A.B. in history from Princeton University in 1952 after completing a 188-page senior thesis, titled "Two Sides of the Conflict: Bevin vs. Bevan", under the supervision of Walter P. Hall. He was a member of Phi Delta Theta. He remained in the Marine Corps Reserve until 1958, and rose to the rank of captain. He earned a Bachelor of Laws (1957) from the University of Texas School of Law and began to practice law in Texas.

From 1957 to 1975, he practiced law at Andrews & Kurth after the anti-nepotism policy of his family firm, Baker Botts, prevented him from receiving a job there.

Early political career
Baker's first wife, the former Mary Stuart McHenry, was active in the Republican Party, working on the congressional campaigns of George H. W. Bush. Originally, Baker had been a Democrat but too busy trying to succeed in a competitive law firm to worry about politics, and considered himself apolitical. His wife's influence led Baker to politics and the Republican Party. He was a regular tennis partner of George H. W. Bush at the Houston Country Club in the late 1950s. When George Herbert Walker Bush  decided to vacate his congressional seat and run for the U.S. Senate in 1970, he supported Baker's decision to run for the congressional seat he was vacating. However, Baker changed his mind about running for Congress when his wife was diagnosed with breast cancer; she died in February 1970.

George Herbert Walker Bush then encouraged Baker to become active in politics to help deal with the grief of his wife's death, something that George Herbert Walker Bush himself had done when his daughter, Pauline Robinson Bush (1949–1953), died of leukemia. Baker became chairman of Bush's Senate campaign in Harris County, Texas. Though Bush lost to Lloyd Bentsen in the election, Baker continued in politics, becoming the finance chairman of the Texas Republican Party in 1971. The following year, he was selected as Gulf Coast Regional Chairman for the Richard Nixon presidential campaign. In 1973 and 1974, in the wake of the Nixon Administration's implosion over Watergate, Baker returned to full-time law practice at Andrews & Kurth.

Baker's time away from politics was very brief, however. In August 1975, he was appointed Under Secretary of Commerce by President Gerald Ford, succeeding John K. Tabor. He served until May 1976, and was succeeded by Edward O. Vetter. Baker resigned to serve as campaign manager of Ford's unsuccessful 1976 election campaign. In 1978, with George H. W. Bush as his campaign manager, Baker ran unsuccessfully for Attorney General of Texas, losing to future Texas governor Mark White.

Reagan administration

White House Chief of Staff (1981–1985) 
In 1981, Baker was named White House Chief of Staff by President Ronald Reagan, in spite of the fact that Baker managed the presidential campaigns of Gerald Ford in 1976 and of George Bush in 1980 opposing Reagan. He served in that capacity until 1985. Baker is considered to have had a high degree of influence over the first Reagan administration, particularly in domestic policy.

In 1982, conservative activists Howard Phillips (founder of the Conservative Caucus) and Clymer Wright of Houston joined in an unsuccessful effort to convince Reagan to dismiss Baker as chief of staff. They claimed that Baker, a former Democrat and a Bush political intimate, was undermining conservative initiatives in the administration. Reagan rejected the Phillips-Wright request. Around 1983 Baker became heavily dispirited and tired due to the weight of his job; he attempted to become National Security Advisor, a change to which Reagan initially agreed, but some of Reagan's other advisers dissuaded him from naming Baker to the position. According to his wife, Baker was "so anxious to get out of [his job]" that he gave some consideration to the prospect of becoming Commissioner of Baseball, but he ultimately did not pursue that.

Baker managed Reagan's 1984 re-election campaign in which Reagan polled a record 525 electoral votes total (of a possible 538), and received 58.8% of the popular vote to Walter Mondale's 40.6%.

Secretary of the Treasury 

In 1985, Reagan named Baker as United States Secretary of the Treasury, in a job-swap with then-Secretary Donald Regan, a former Merrill Lynch officer who became chief of staff. Reagan rebuked Phillips and Wright for having waged a "campaign of sabotage" against Baker.

While serving as Treasury Secretary, Baker organized the Plaza Accord of September 1985 and the Baker Plan to target international debt. He had Richard Darman of Massachusetts as his Deputy Secretary of the Treasury. Darman continued in the next administration as the Director of the Office of Management and Budget.

In 1985, Baker received the U.S. Senator John Heinz Award for Greatest Public Service by an Elected or Appointed Official, an award given out annually by Jefferson Awards.

During the Reagan administration, Baker also served on the Economic Policy Council, where he played an instrumental role in achieving the passage of the administration's tax and budget reform package in 1981. He also played a role in the development of the American Silver Eagle and American Gold Eagle coins, which both were released in 1986.

Baker also served on Reagan's National Security Council, and remained Treasury Secretary until 1988, during which time he also served as campaign chairman for George H. W. Bush's successful presidential bid.

Bush administration

Secretary of State 

President George H. W. Bush appointed Baker Secretary of State in 1989. Baker served in this role through 1992. From 1992 to 1993, he served as Bush's White House Chief of Staff, the same position that he had held from 1981 to 1985 during the first Reagan Administration.

In May 1990, Soviet Union's reformist leader Mikhail Gorbachev visited the U.S. for talks with President Bush; there, he agreed to allow a reunified Germany to be a part of NATO. He later revealed that he had agreed to do so because James Baker promised that NATO troops would not be posted to eastern Germany and that the military alliance would not expand into Eastern Europe. Privately, Bush ignored Baker's assurances and later pushed for NATO's eastwards expansion. In the Bush administration, Baker was a proponent of the notion that the USSR should be kept territorially intact, arguing that it would be destabilizing to have the USSR's nuclear arsenal in multiple new states. Bush and US defence secretary Dick Cheney were proponents for Soviet dissolution. Soviet states forced action by holding referendums on independence.

When Ukraine became independent, Baker sought to ensure that Ukraine would give up its nuclear weapons.

On January 9, 1991, during the Geneva Peace Conference with Tariq Aziz in Geneva, Baker declared that "If there is any user of (chemical or biological weapons), our objectives won't just be the liberation of Kuwait, but the elimination of the current Iraqi regime...." Baker later acknowledged that the intent of this statement was to threaten a retaliatory nuclear strike on Iraq, and the Iraqis received his message.
Baker helped to construct the 34-nation alliance that fought alongside the United States in the Gulf War.

Baker also spent considerable time negotiating one-on-one with the parties in order to organize the Madrid Conference of October 30-November 1, 1991, in an attempt to revive the Israeli–Palestinian peace process through negotiations involving Israel and the Palestinians, as well as Arab countries, including Jordan, Lebanon, and Syria.

Baker was awarded the Presidential Medal of Freedom in 1991.

Policies on the Israeli-Arab conflict 

Before the 1988 election, he and a team of some Middle Eastern policies experts created a report detailing the Palestine-Israel interactions. His team included Dennis Ross and many others who were soon appointed to the new Bush Administration.

Baker blocked the recognition of Palestine by threatening to cut funding to agencies in the United Nations. As far back as 1988, the Palestine Liberation Organization (PLO) issued a "declaration of statehood" and changed the name of its observer delegation to the United Nations from the PLO to Palestine.

Baker warned publicly, "I will recommend to the President that the United States make no further contributions, voluntary or assessed, to any international organization which makes any changes in the PLO's status as an observer organization."

In May 1989, he gave a speech at the annual conference of the American Israel Public Affairs Committee. He called for Israel to "lay aside once and for all, the unrealistic vision of a greater Israel", cease the construction of Israeli settlements in West Bank and Gaza, forswear annexation of more territory, and to treat Palestinians "as neighbors who deserve political rights". Israeli officials and public were highly offended due to the tone of his speech, though his address called for little more than his predecessors.

Baker soon decided that Aaron David Miller and Daniel Kurtzer would be his principal aides in Middle Eastern policies. All three have been reported as leaning toward the policies of the Israeli Labor Party.

Baker was notable for making little and slow efforts towards improving the state of Israeli-Palestinian relations. When Bush was elected, he only received 29% of Jewish voters' support, and his reelection was thought to be imminent, so there was little pressure on the administration to make bold moves in diplomatic relations with Israel. Israeli leaders initially thought that Baker had a poor grasp of Middle Eastern issues – a perception exacerbated by his use of the term "Greater Israel" – and viewed Israel as a "problem for the United States" according to Moshe Arens. Baker proved willing to confront Israeli officials on statements they made contrary to American interests. After Israeli Deputy Foreign Minister Benjamin Netanyahu accused the United States of "building its policy on a foundation of distortion and lies," Baker banned Netanyahu from entering the State Department building, and refused to meet with him personally for the remainder of his tenure as secretary.

During his first eight months under the Bush administration, there were five meetings with the PLO, which is far less than his predecessors. All serious issues that Palestine sought to discuss, such as elections and representation in the Israeli government, were delegated to Egypt for decisions to be made.

More tensions rose in the Palestinian-Israeli conflict with a massive influx of Jewish people from the Soviet Union moved to Israel. The Israeli government decided to expand the population further into Palestinian territories. Amidst the growing support of Saddam Hussein in Palestine, due to his opposition toward Israel, and his invasion of Kuwait, and the beginning of the Gulf War, Baker decided that he would make some moves towards developing communications between Israel and Palestine.

Baker became the first American statesman to negotiate directly and officially with Palestinians in the Madrid Conference of 1991, which was the first comprehensive peace conference that involved every party involved in the Arab-Israeli conflict and the conference was designed to address all outstanding issues.

After this landmark event, he did not work to further improve Arab-Israeli relations. The administration forced Israel to halt the development of the 6,000 planned housing units, but the 11,000 housing units already under construction were permitted to be completed and inhabited with no penalty. In the meantime, Baker also tried to negotiate with the Syrian President Hafez al-Assad, in order to achieve a lasting peace between Israel and Syria.

However, Baker has been criticized for spending much of his tenure in a state of inaction regarding the Israeli-Palestinian conflict, which arguably led to further infringements on Palestinian rights and the growing radicalism of Arabs and Israelis.

White House Chief of Staff (1992–1993) 
The 1992 election was complicated by the on-again-off-again candidacy of Ross Perot, who would end up taking 19% of the popular vote. In August, following the Democratic Convention, with Bush trailing Clinton in the polls by 24 points, Bush announced that Baker would return to the White House as Chief of Staff and as head of the re-election campaign. However, despite having run two winning campaigns for Ronald Reagan and one for Bush, Baker was unsuccessful in the second campaign for Bush, who lost to Clinton by 370 electoral votes to 168.

Post-Cabinet career

1993–2000

In 1993, Baker became the honorary chair of the James A. Baker III Institute of Public Policy at Rice University in Houston, Texas.

Also in 1993, the Enron Corporation hired Baker as a consultant within a month of his departure from the White House, and Enron said that Baker would have an opportunity to invest in any projects he developed. During his time at Enron, Baker tried to warn against the company's involvement with the Dabhol Power Station in India. Many of Baker's concerns proved correct, and the project became a key factor in the company's downfall.

Also in 1993, Baker joined Baker Botts as a senior partner, as well as the Carlyle Group (with the title of senior counsel).

In 1995, Baker published his memoirs of service as Secretary of State in a book entitled The Politics of Diplomacy: Revolution, War and Peace, 1989–1992.

In March 1997, Baker became the Personal Envoy of the UN Secretary-General for Western Sahara. In June 2004, he resigned from this position, frustrated over the lack of progress in reaching a complete settlement acceptable to both the government of Morocco and the pro-independence Polisario Front. He left behind the Baker II plan, accepted as a suitable basis of negotiations by the Polisario and unanimously endorsed by the Security Council, but rejected by Morocco.

In addition to the numerous recognitions received by Baker, he was presented with the prestigious Woodrow Wilson Award for public service on September 13, 2000, in Washington, D.C.

2000 presidential election and recount 
In 2000, Baker served as chief legal adviser for George W. Bush during the 2000 presidential election campaign and oversaw the Florida recount. The 2008 film Recount covers the days following the controversial election.  Baker was interviewed during the making of the film, and British actor Tom Wilkinson portrayed him in it.

Roles during the Bush administration and Iraq War 
Baker also advised George W. Bush on Iraq. When the U.S. occupation of Iraq began in 2003 he was one of the Bush administration's first choices to direct the Coalition Provisional Authority, but he was deemed too old. In December 2003, President George W. Bush appointed Baker as his special envoy to ask various foreign creditor nations to forgive or restructure $100 billion in international debts owed by the Iraq government which had been incurred during the tenure of Saddam Hussein.

State of Denial, a book by investigative reporter Bob Woodward, says that White House Chief of Staff Andrew Card urged President Bush to replace Secretary of Defense Donald Rumsfeld with Baker following the 2004 presidential election. Bush later confirmed that he made such an offer to Baker but that he declined.  Bush would appoint another G. H. W. Bush Administration veteran, Robert Gates, instead, after the 2006 midterm elections. Baker was elected a Fellow of the American Academy of Arts and Sciences in 2008.

On March 15, 2006, Congress announced the formation of the Iraq Study Group, a high-level panel of prominent former officials charged by members of Congress with taking a fresh look at America's policy on Iraq. Baker was the Republican co-chairman along with Democratic Congressman Lee H. Hamilton, to advise Congress on Iraq. The Iraq Study Group examined a number of ideas, including one that would create a new power-sharing arrangement in Iraq that would give more autonomy to regional factions. On October 9, 2006, the Washington Post quoted co-chairman Baker as saying "our commission believes that there are alternatives between the stated alternatives, the ones that are out there in the political debate, of 'stay the course' and 'cut and run'".

Donald Trump 
Baker voted for Donald Trump in the 2016 election, and said prior to the 2020 election that he would do so again. During a 2016 memorial service for Nancy Reagan, he commented to former Canadian Prime Minister Brian Mulroney that he believed there were parallels between the rise of Trump and the rise of Reagan. He later gave informal advice to Trump during his 2016 presidential campaign and suggested the appointment of Rex Tillerson as Secretary of State.

Other advisory positions

Baker serves on the Honorary Council of Advisers for the U.S.-Azerbaijan Chamber of Commerce.

Baker also serves as an honorary director on the board of directors at the Atlantic Council.

James Baker serves as an Honorary Co-Chair for the World Justice Project. The World Justice Project works to lead a global, multidisciplinary effort to strengthen the Rule of Law for the development of communities of opportunity and equity.

Baker is a leader of the Climate Leadership Council, along with Henry Paulson and George P. Shultz. In 2017, this group of "Republican elder statesmen" proposed that conservatives embrace a fee and dividend form of carbon tax (in which all revenue generated by the tax is rebated to the populace in the form of lump-sum dividends), as a policy to deal with anthropogenic climate change. The group also included Martin S. Feldstein and N. Gregory Mankiw.

Baker began service on the Rice University board of trustees in 1993.

Personal life
Baker met his first wife, the former Mary Stuart McHenry, of Dayton, Ohio, while on spring break in Bermuda with the Princeton University rugby team. They married in 1953. Together they had four sons, including James Addison Baker IV, a partner at Baker Botts. Mary Stuart Baker (Mary Stuart was her full first name) died of breast cancer in February 1970.

In 1973, Baker and Susan Garrett Winston, a divorcee and a close friend of Mary Stuart, were married.  Winston had two sons and a daughter with her former husband. She and Baker welcomed their daughter Mary Bonner Baker, born in 1977.

On June 15, 2002, Virginia Graeme Baker, the seven-year-old granddaughter of Baker, daughter of Nancy and James Baker IV, was the victim of lethal suction entrapment in an in-ground spa. To promote greater safety in pools and spas, Nancy Baker gave testimony to the Consumer Product Safety Commission, and James Baker helped form an advocacy group, which led to the Virginia Graeme Baker Pool And Spa Safety Act (15 USC 8001). Another granddaughter is Rosebud Baker, a stand-up comedian.

Awards and honors
Jefferson Awards for Public Service (1985)
Presidential Medal of Freedom (1991)
Golden Plate Award of the American Academy of Achievement (1998)
 Grand Cordon of the Order of the Rising Sun (2015)

Notes

References

Further reading

Works by
 1995: The Politics of Diplomacy. with Thomas M. DeFrank. New York: G.P. Putnam's Sons. .
 2006: "Work Hard, Study... And Keep Out of Politics!": Adventures and Lessons from an Unexpected Public Life. with Steve Fiffer. New York: G.P. Putnam's Sons. .

Works about
 Bryce, Robert, (2004). Cronies: Oil, the Bushes, and the Rise of Texas, America's Superstate. New York: Perseus Books Group. .

External links

 Baker, James III(Woodson Research Center, Fondren Library, Rice University, Houston, TX, USA)
 James Addison Baker Papers at the Seeley G. Mudd Manuscript Library, Princeton University
 James A. Baker III Oral History Collection at the Seeley G. Mudd Manuscript Library, Princeton University
 Profile in the Daily Princetonian
 Biography on Baker Botts LLP website
 Baker Institute for Public Policy
 
 James Baker Oral History at Houston Oral History Project, November 20, 2007. 

|-

|-

|-

|-

1930 births
20th-century American politicians
American campaign managers
American memoirists
Atlantic Council
The Carlyle Group people
Fellows of the American Academy of Arts and Sciences
George H. W. Bush administration cabinet members
George W. Bush administration personnel
Living people
Military personnel from Texas
Presidential Medal of Freedom recipients
Princeton University alumni
Reagan administration cabinet members
Texas lawyers
Texas Republicans
The Kinkaid School alumni
The Hill School alumni
United States Marine Corps officers
United States Under Secretaries of Commerce
United States Secretaries of State
United States Secretaries of the Treasury
University of Texas School of Law alumni
White House Chiefs of Staff
Writers from Houston
Rice University trustees
United States Marine Corps reservists